Antal Gáborfi (born 9 June 1904, date of death unknown) was a Hungarian swimmer. He competed in the men's 100 metre freestyle event at the 1928 Summer Olympics.

References

1904 births
Year of death missing
Hungarian male swimmers
Olympic swimmers of Hungary
Swimmers at the 1928 Summer Olympics
Swimmers from Budapest